St. Augustine in His Study (also called Vision of St. Augustine) is a tempera on panel painting by the Italian Renaissance artist Vittore Carpaccio housed in the Scuola di San Giorgio degli Schiavoni of Venice, northern Italy.

History
The works dates to Carpaccio's mature period, when he was commissioned by the "scuola" (guild or corporation) of the Schiavoni (Dalmatians) to execute a cycle of nine paintings narrating the stories of their patron saints (George, Jerome, Augustine and Tryphon). The work began in 1502 and was completed in 1508.

In the 1940s, the paintings underwent restoration that has since discoloured Carpaccio's original vibrant palette to amber tones. Some works have also partially detached from their canvas support and have areas of lifting and flaking paint, as well as scratches and abrasions. In September 2019, an expected two-year conservation campaign began under the sponsorship by the non-profit organization Save Venice Inc.

Description

The work portrays the traditional episode of Saint Jerome appearing to St. Augustine to announce his imminent death and departure to Heaven. Carpaccio portrayed the African saint in his studio, in the moment in which he is distracted from his reading by the voice of Jerome,  coming  as a luminous shape in the window near the desk. The room is  that typical of an acculturated humanist of the painter's age, depicted with his usual attention to details.

The room is roughly rectangular, with a painted ceiling. Augustine sits on a bench over a pad, covered with green cloth and lined with studs; the desk is supported by a candelabrum. Some of the books   show musical lines. Under the window are a file and an hourglass. Other elements depicted include measurement instruments, precious caskets, a bell, a shell, an armillary sphere, vases, bottles and others.

In the center is a niche with an altar, where, as shown by the curtain moved aside, are Augustine's liturgic objects: a vest, a mitre, the crosier and a thurible which hangs near two candelabra. At the side of the altars are two twin portals, with fine decorations in Renaissance style. The left one is open, and shows a small room with a window, according to the taste for different lighting sources inspired by Flemish painting: this had become popular in Venice after its use by Antonello da Messina in paintings such as St. Jerome in His Study, which Carpaccio could perhaps observe and study. Here is a further number of details: a table with three couples of crossed legs and covered by a red tablecloth, further books, and, on a shelf running for the room's perimeter, several scientific and astronomical instruments, including Regiomontanus' astrolabe which, at the time, was owned only by John Bessarion, and is likely to have inspired Carpaccio for the saint's representation.

On the left two long shelves, housing more books with gaudy covers, a series of antiques (vases, bronze and others), a candle basement shaped as a lion paw (another is placed symmetrically on the opposite wall) and, below, large volumes, a seat and a prie-dieu. In the center of the room is a German Spitz dog and, nearby, a cartouche with the artist's signature and the date.

See also
St. George and the Dragon (Carpaccio)

References

Sources

1502 paintings
Paintings by Vittore Carpaccio
Dogs in art
Paintings of Augustine of Hippo
Paintings in Venice
Books in art